The year 1994 was the 213th year of the Rattanakosin Kingdom of Thailand. It was the 49th year of the reign of King Bhumibol Adulyadej (Rama IX) and is reckoned as the year 2537 in the Buddhist Era.

Incumbents
King: Bhumibol Adulyadej 
Crown Prince: Vajiralongkorn
Prime Minister: Chuan Leekpai
Supreme Patriarch: Nyanasamvara Suvaddhana

Events

January

February

March

April

May

June

July

August

September

October

November

December

Births

Deaths

See also
 1994 in Thai television
 List of Thai films of 1994

References

External links

 
Years of the 20th century in Thailand
Thailand
Thailand
1990s in Thailand